John William Oliver (born 23 April 1977) is a British-American comedian, writer, producer, political commentator, actor, and television host. Oliver started his career as a stand-up comedian in the United Kingdom. He came to wider attention for his work in the United States on The Daily Show with Jon Stewart as its senior British correspondent from 2006 to 2013. Oliver won three Primetime Emmy Awards for writing for The Daily Show and was the show's guest host for an eight-week period in 2013. In addition, Oliver co-hosted the satirical comedy podcast The Bugle with Andy Zaltzman, with whom Oliver had previously co-hosted the radio series Political Animal, and hosted John Oliver's New York Stand-Up Show on Comedy Central from 2010 to 2013. He has also acted on television, most notably in a recurring role as Professor Ian Duncan on the NBC sitcom Community, and in films, notably voice-over work in The Smurfs (2011), The Smurfs 2 (2013), and the 2019 remake of The Lion King. He became a US citizen in 2019.

Since 2014, Oliver has been the host of the HBO series Last Week Tonight with John Oliver. He has received widespread critical and popular recognition for his work on the series, whose influence over US culture, legislation, and policymaking has been dubbed the "John Oliver effect". For his work on Last Week Tonight, Oliver has won fourteen Emmy Awards and two Peabody Awards and was included in the 2015 Time 100, being described as a "comedic agent of change...powerful because he isn't afraid to tackle important issues thoughtfully, without fear or apology". Oliver's work has been described as journalism or investigative journalism, a description Oliver rejects.

Early life and education
Oliver was born on 23 April 1977 in Birmingham, England, to Carole and Jim Oliver. His father, from the Wirral Peninsula, was both a school headmaster and social worker, and his mother, from Liverpool, was a music teacher. His uncle was the composer Stephen Oliver. William Boyd Carpenter, Bishop of Ripon and court chaplain to Queen Victoria, was his paternal great-great-grandfather. Oliver was educated in Bedford at the Mark Rutherford School, and learned to play the viola as a child.

Since childhood, he has been a fan of Liverpool F.C., noting in interviews that "my mum's family are from Knotty Ash and my dad's family are from the Wirral, so supporting Liverpool was very much not a choice".

Following secondary school, he studied at Christ's College, Cambridge. While a student there in the mid-to-late 1990s, Oliver was a member of the Cambridge Footlights, the university theatrical club run by students of Cambridge University. Oliver's contemporaries included David Mitchell and Richard Ayoade. In 1997, he became the club's vice president. In 1998, Oliver graduated from Cambridge with a degree in English.

Career

Journalism and writing 
In an appearance on Late Night with Seth Meyers, Oliver revealed one of his first paying jobs was writing for the British morning show The Big Breakfast.

Stand-up

Oliver first appeared at the Edinburgh Festival Fringe in 2001 as part of The Comedy Zone, a late-night showcase of newer acts, where he played the character of an "oleaginous journalist". Oliver frequently worked with other members of the Chocolate Milk Gang, a group of comedians who collaborated and performed with one another, including Daniel Kitson, Russell Howard, David O'Doherty, and Alun Cochrane. He performed his debut solo show at the 2002 Edinburgh Festival Fringe and returned in 2003. In 2004 and 2005, he collaborated with Andy Zaltzman on a double act and co-hosting Political Animal, with various acts performing political material.

After moving from the UK to New York City for The Daily Show, Oliver began performing stand-up in small clubs around the city and later headlined shows in larger venues. Oliver's first stand-up special, titled John Oliver: Terrifying Times, debuted on Comedy Central in 2008 and was later released on DVD. After 2010, Oliver hosted four seasons of John Oliver's New York Stand-Up Show. In 2013, he went to Afghanistan on a USO tour to perform stand-up for the troops.

According to Edward Helmore in The Guardian, "His style leans toward the kind that Americans like best from the British – exaggerated, full of odd accents and mannerisms, in the vein of Monty Python." Oliver has used his British culture as a primary subject of his jokes. Oliver describes his own accent as a "mongrel" of Brummie, Scouse, and Bedford influences.

Oliver continues to perform stand-up.

Mock the Week
Prior to joining The Daily Show, Oliver made appearances on British television as a panellist on the satirical news quiz Mock the Week. He was a frequent guest on the first two series in 2005 and 2006, appearing in seven out of eleven episodes.

The Daily Show with Jon Stewart

Oliver joined The Daily Show with Jon Stewart as its Senior British Correspondent in July 2006. He says he was interviewed for the show on the recommendation of comedian Ricky Gervais, who had never met Oliver, but was familiar with his work. Two weeks after the interview, he got the job, flying from London to New York on a Sunday and unexpectedly appearing on camera the next day. Oliver received Emmy Awards for outstanding writing on The Daily Show in 2009, 2011, and 2012.

During the summer of 2013, Oliver guest-hosted The Daily Show for eight weeks while Stewart directed his film Rosewater. Oliver's performance received positive reviews, with some critics suggesting that he should eventually succeed Stewart as the host, or receive his own show. CBS discussed the possibility of Oliver replacing Craig Ferguson on The Late Late Show. Three months after his role as the interim Daily Show host ended, HBO announced it was giving Oliver his own late-night show.

The Bugle

From October 2007 to May 2015, Oliver co-hosted The Bugle, a weekly satirical comedy podcast, with Andy Zaltzman. Originally produced by The Times, it became an independent project in 2012. Its 200th episode aired on 13 July 2012. The show reached a download count of 500,000 a month.

John Oliver's New York Stand-Up Show

In 2009, Comedy Central announced that it would be ordering six episodes of the Oliver-hosted John Oliver's New York Stand-Up Show, a stand-up series on Comedy Central that featured sets from himself and other stand-up comedians, including Janeane Garofalo, Brian Posehn, Paul F. Tompkins and Marc Maron. Oliver executive-produced the show along with Avalon Television's Richard Allen-Turner, David Martin, James Taylor and Jon Thoday. From 2010 to 2013, four seasons of the show were produced, the final season lasting eight episodes.

Last Week Tonight

Oliver began hosting Last Week Tonight with John Oliver, a late-night talk show that takes a satirical look at politics and current events, on 27 April 2014. His initial two-year contract with HBO was extended through 2017 in February 2015, through 2020 in September 2017, and through 2023 in September 2020. Oliver says he has full creative freedom, including free rein to criticise corporations, given HBO's ad-free subscription model. His work on the show led to Oliver being named on the list of Time magazine's "100 Most Influential People" in 2015.

In 2018, Last Week Tonight was honoured with a Peabody Award in the "Entertainment" category for "bringing satire and journalism even closer together", at the 77th Annual Peabody Awards. The show has also won 26 Primetime Emmy Awards and five Writers Guild of America Awards.

Television acting
As a boy, Oliver played Felix Pardiggle, a minor role in the BBC drama Bleak House in 1985.

Oliver had a recurring role on the NBC comedy Community as psychology professor Ian Duncan. However, he declined to become a regular cast member because he did not want to leave The Daily Show. He did not appear in the third and fourth seasons, but returned in season five, appearing in seven of its thirteen episodes. He was not in season six which aired on Yahoo!

Oliver has also guest-starred in The Simpsons as Booth Wilkes-John (season twenty-five, episode twenty-one) Gravity Falls as the voice of Sherlock Holmes (season one, episode three), Rick and Morty as an amoeba named Dr Xenon Bloom (season one, episode three), People Like Us as a bank manager (season two, episode five) Randy Cunningham: 9th Grade Ninja as the voice of Coach Green, My Hero as a man from the BBC (season two, episode five), Green Wing as a car salesman (season one, episode one), and Bob's Burgers as a cat agent (season seven, episode ten). Oliver voiced the camp counsellor Harry in season four of the Netflix series Big Mouth.

Film

In 2008, Oliver was given his first film role, playing Dick Pants in The Love Guru. He later voiced Vanity Smurf in The Smurfs film and its sequel. He was originally cast in 2010 to star in the Terry Jones film Absolutely Anything as Neil Clarke, but scheduling conflicts due to the debut of Last Week Tonight in 2014 led to the role being recast for Simon Pegg. In 2019, Oliver voiced porcupine Steve in the CGI animated film Wonder Park and hornbill Zazu in the remake of Disney's The Lion King.

Other work
Oliver wrote and presented a BBC America campaign to have viewers use subtitles (closed captioning). Shown in brief segments before shows, "The following program contains accents you would have heard a lot more if you hadn't thrown our tea into Boston Harbour", says one. "Not even British people can follow the British accent 100 per cent of the time. Therefore you, like me, might want to use closed-captioning." Oliver used some of these jokes in his stand-up routine.

Oliver frequently appeared on the BBC Radio 5 Live sports show Fighting Talk. In 1997, Oliver acted in a British television advert promoting the use of cable telecommunication systems for Cable & Wireless plc.

From 2002 to 2003, Oliver worked on the BBC 3 comedy series The State We're In, along with Anita Rani, Jon Holmes, and Robin Ince. In 2003, Oliver manned the "results desk" on an election night episode of Armando Iannucci's satirical show Gash on Channel 4. He would work with Iannucci again in 2005, as a panellist in the first two episodes of Armando Iannucci's Charm Offensive. In 2004, Oliver wrote and performed in the satirical radio programme The Department on BBC Radio 4, with frequent comedy partner Andy Zaltzman and Chris Addison. Oliver performed various roles in the 2009 Comedy Central series Important Things with Demetri Martin.

In 2009, Oliver made a cameo appearance as the actor Rip Torn in the music video for The Fiery Furnaces' single "Even in the Rain", which is based on the story of the making of the film Easy Rider.
In 2018, Oliver began working as an executive producer for Wyatt Cenac's Problem Areas until its cancellation in June 2019.

Influence and "The John Oliver effect"

Oliver has said that among his comedic influences are Armando Iannucci, David Letterman, Monty Python, Peter Cook, Richard Pryor, and Jon Stewart. On Monty Python he states, "citing them as an influence is almost redundant. It's assumed. I saw Life of Brian in middle school, when a substitute teacher put it on to keep us quiet on a rainy day. I'm not sure he knew exactly what he was showing us, but I've always been hugely grateful for the reckless professional mistake he made that day, because I've never forgotten how it made me feel."

Oliver's comedic commentary has been credited with helping influence US legislation, regulations, court rulings, and other aspects of US culture; this influence has been dubbed "The John Oliver effect". This came from the show's fifth episode, which dealt with net neutrality, a subject that had previously been considered obscure and technical. Oliver documented problems attributed to internet service providers and argued that the Federal Communications Commission (FCC) could resolve these concerns with upcoming changes to internet regulation. Oliver then encouraged viewers to submit public comments through the FCC's website. The FCC's website promptly crashed. Internal FCC emails revealed the clip was being watched inside the agency. FCC Chairman Tom Wheeler publicly addressed the video. The FCC was flooded with 3.7 million comments on the subject, by far the most for any issue in the agency's history. Reporters detected a shift in the FCC's stance: Before Oliver's segment, The New York Times described an FCC proposal that would leave net neutrality "all but dead", but the paper later said that chairman Wheeler showed "a steady shift toward stronger regulation". Ultimately, the FCC enacted robust net neutrality rules that classified broadband internet service as a public utility. Oliver was credited with transforming the net neutrality debate.

A Ninth Circuit Court judge cited a Last Week Tonight segment about the lesser constitutional rights of residents of US territories in a ruling in favour of the residents of Guam. Members of Congress credited Oliver with helping win a vote to enforce protections for chicken farmers who speak out about industry practices after a Last Week Tonight segment aired on the subject. A Washington, D.C., council member proposed a resolution in Oliver's honour after he aired a segment on the district's struggle to attain statehood.

Oliver maintains that he is not a journalist, but reporters have argued that his show does engage in journalism. The Peabody Awards honoured Oliver, saying his program engages in "investigative reports that 'real' news programs would do well to emulate". One example of Oliver's investigative work is a segment on the Miss America organization, which bills itself as "the world's largest provider of scholarships for women." Oliver's team, which includes four researchers with journalism backgrounds, collected and analysed the organization's state and federal tax forms to find that its scholarship programme only distributes a small fraction of the claimed "$45 million made available annually". Oliver said that at the national level, the Miss America Organization and Miss America Foundation together spent only $482,000 in cash scholarships in 2012. Oliver found that at the state level, the Miss Alabama Pageant claimed that it had provided $2,592,000 in scholarships to Troy University despite not actually distributing any such scholarships. The official YouTube video of Oliver's Miss America segment has been viewed more than 15 million times. The Society of Women Engineers said Oliver's reference to their scholarship led to $25,000 in donations over the subsequent two days.

Oliver has also founded and legally incorporated a church, Our Lady of Perpetual Exemption, to demonstrate how easy it is to qualify as a church and receive tax exempt status in the United States. The church was created in conjunction with a segment on televangelists who have tax-free mansions and private jets funded by millions of dollars in donations, which are sent in the belief that money given to televangelists can result in God rewarding donors with money, blessings, and cured diseases. The next week, Oliver showed off the large quantity of unsolicited donations posted to him, which included $70,000 in cash, a large cheque, and other gifts. The church's website stated that donations would go to Doctors Without Borders upon the church's dissolution.

Oliver's February 2016 segment on presidential candidate Donald Trump received over 85 million views on Facebook and YouTube within a month, and was reportedly the "most watched piece of HBO content ever". A network spokesperson said that this was "a record for any piece of HBO content". In 2018 on Last Week Tonight, Oliver presented A Day in the Life of Marlon Bundo, a gay parody of Marlon Bundo's A Day in the Life of the Vice President with Marlon Bundo as protagonist.

In August 2020, Mayor Mark Boughton announced plans to rename the City of Danbury Sewer Treatment Plant as the "John Oliver Memorial Sewer Plant" in retaliation for remarks Oliver had previously made mocking Danbury. This was completed after the approval of local government, with Oliver attending the opening ceremony.

Personal life

Oliver lives in New York City with his wife Kate Norley, an Iraq War veteran who served as a United States Army medic. Oliver has said that they met at the 2008 Republican National Convention; he was doing a piece for The Daily Show and Norley was campaigning with Vets for Freedom. She and other veterans hid Oliver, the other correspondents, and the camera crew from security. The two married in October 2011, and have two sons, one born prematurely in 2015 and one born in 2018. Oliver occasionally wears a 1st Cavalry Division lapel pin – his wife's unit in Iraq. Oliver has a younger sister who lives in Australia.

Oliver's immigration status placed certain constraints on what he could do in his adopted country, but also provided him with comedy material as he poked fun at the opacity and occasional absurdity of the process of obtaining US residency. Oliver was one of the many writers on the picket lines during the Writers' Guild strike, which brought The Daily Show to a halt; he appeared on the show upon its resuming production on 7 January 2008. During a sketch, he pointed out that he was then in America on a visitors' visa that requires him not to strike while the show is in production, as violation of the terms of the visa would be grounds for deportation. When asked about his residency status in early 2009, Oliver said, "It's an ongoing, and slightly unsettling, battle to be honest. I tried engraving 'Give me your tired, your poor, and your aspiring comic performers' into the base of the Statue of Liberty, but apparently that's not legally binding."

In an episode of The Bugle released on 2 November 2009, and recorded on 30 October 2009, Oliver announced that he "finally got approved for [his] green card" (for US residency), noting that now he can "get arrested filming bits for The Daily Show". Oliver says he was given a scare when applying at the US embassy in London, when an immigration officer asked, "Give me one good reason I should let you back in to insult my country?", which the officer followed up with, "Oh, I'm just kidding, I love the show". Since then, he has referred to Americans as "us" or "you" based on what each segment has demanded. Oliver was naturalized as a US citizen on 13 December 2019.

Oliver's philanthropy includes an on-air giveaway in which he forgave over $15 million of medical debt owed by over 9,000 people. He purchased the debt for $60,000 and forgave it on his show on 4 June 2016.

Since moving to the United States, Oliver has been a fan of the New York Mets. Oliver has said that being a New York Yankees fan would be the "wrong thing to do morally".

Oliver was raised in the Church of England. His Anglicanism lapsed when he was aged 12 because of the death of a school friend and an uncle, and a feeling of not having received any useful answers from his church.

Political views 
Oliver has been opposed to Brexit, making multiple pieces about it and calling it "painful, it's pointless, and most of you didn't even agree to run it; you were just signed up by your dumbest friend". He also found it "sad" to consider that his children with British citizenship would not experience the benefits of the EU. He has also been highly critical of the British Conservative Party and Boris Johnson in particular. In November 2022, he made a piece criticising the British monarchy, stating "we've long evolved past needing them". He also criticised the Royal Family's secrecy concerning their wealth, calling them "a freeloading multimillionaire family exempt from paying most taxes" and stating that "the Royal Family's wealth ― unlike its gene pool ― is massive". He has been in favour of Britain becoming a Republic.  

Oliver declined an Order of the British Empire. On a September 2022 edition of Late Night with Seth Meyers, he said he declined the award because the words "British Empire" in its title made him uncomfortable.

In American politics, Oliver endorsed Joe Biden for president of the United States and celebrated Biden and Kamala Harris's victory in the 2020 US presidential election. He warned that "more than 70 million people voted for [Trump] and everything he said and stands for, and that is something we are going to have to reckon with for the foreseeable future". Due to his strong criticism of Trump and the Republican Party on Last Week Tonight, Oliver and Last Week Tonight were accused of liberal-bias; Zac Davis wrote in America that Oliver "robs his viewers of the opportunity to think, or have any deep understanding of an issue". Contrarily, Politico argued that Oliver criticised liberal politicians as much as those on the right.

In May 2021, Oliver said Israeli airstrikes on civilian buildings in the Gaza Strip "sure seem like a war crime" and added that "Life in Gaza is hard even when they're not being bombed, and the US government has implicitly co-signed on the brutally hard line Israel's been taking."

Legacy

John Oliver Koala Chlamydia Ward 
In May 2018, Australian actor Russell Crowe donated approximately $80,000 to the Australia Zoo wildlife hospital for the creation and naming of "The John Oliver Koala Chlamydia Ward". Oliver had previously bought several movie props screen-used by Crowe in an auction, including his jockstrap from the movie Cinderella Man, which he sent to the last Alaskan Blockbuster Video store for exhibition. Crowe then donated the proceeds from the auction towards the establishment of the Chlamydia Ward named after Oliver, calling it "a cool way" to honour him. Covering the story on his show, Oliver admitted admiration for the gag: "Well played Russell Crowe. Well played indeed. That may honestly be the greatest thing I've ever seen." Crowe visited the ward in early 2020, posing with the nameplate bearing Oliver's name.

John Oliver Memorial Sewer Plant 

In August 2020, Danbury, Connecticut mayor Mark Boughton announced in a Facebook video his intention to rename the Danbury Water Pollution Control Plant as the "John Oliver Memorial Sewer Plant" as a comedic symbol of his displeasure at Oliver's hyperbolic insult to the city during a segment concerning alleged racial disparities in a jury selection process. After reporting that Connecticut jury rolls had excluded two entire towns, Oliver said, "If you're going to forget a town in Connecticut, why not forget Danbury?" Oliver then humorously offered to "thrash" the entire town, including its children.

As a response to mayor Boughton's sardonic video, Oliver embraced the idea enthusiastically, promising to donate $55,000 to Danbury's charities if the town renamed the sewage plant after him.

After the city council voted 18–1 in favour of naming the plant after him, Oliver secretly visited Danbury on 8 October 2020 to attend the unveiling ceremony in person, wearing a hazmat suit. Mayor Boughton had made Oliver's personal attendance a condition for the renaming, and Oliver complied, revealing footage of his trip on Last Week Tonight the following week.

Filmography

Film

Television

Awards and nominations

Published works
 Earth (The Book): A Visitor's Guide to the Human Race (Grand Central Publishing, 2010)

Notes

See also
 New Yorkers in journalism

References

External links 

 
 
 

1977 births
Living people
People from Erdington
20th-century English comedians
20th-century English male actors
21st-century English comedians
21st-century English male actors
Alumni of Christ's College, Cambridge
American political commentators
American television personalities
Anti-monarchists
Male television personalities
Comedians from Birmingham, West Midlands
English expatriates in the United States
English male comedians
English male television actors
English male voice actors
English podcasters
English political commentators
English republicans
English television personalities
English television producers
Former Anglicans
Last Week Tonight with John Oliver
Late night television talk show hosts
National Youth Theatre members
People educated at Mark Rutherford School
People with acquired American citizenship
Primetime Emmy Award winners
Writers Guild of America Award winners